Wilde Alliance is a British television series produced by Yorkshire Television for the ITV network in 1978. The programme was a light-hearted mystery series created by Ian Mackintosh about a husband-and-wife pair of amateur detectives, Rupert and Amy Wilde (played by John Stride and Julia Foster).

Rupert is a crime novelist, while his wife Amy is his PA, as well as being an artist and designer in her own right. They live in a luxurious apartment in an old Manor House in York, but despite this and an enjoyment of the finer things in life, they are sometimes short of money and are often dogged by Income tax demands. In one episode they even fly on holiday to Amsterdam (in the episode "Affray in Amsterdam") to spend what little profit they have made on one book just to avoid the tax man. They indulge in their amateur detecting more as a sort of diversion from the everyday stress of working life.

Also helping out at times was Rupert's long suffering literary agent Christopher Bridgewater (played by John Lee), who was often having to chase up Rupert to meet a book deadline, only to be unwillingly dragged into yet another of their mysteries. However, in one episode (Things That Go Bump) it is him who asks the Wildes to investigate after buying an old property he believes to be haunted. The only other semi regular in the series is a fellow tenant of the Manor House called Bailey (played by Patrick Newell), a dapper dandy of a man who runs a secret business in pornography of all aspects (some less than savory), as well as using his own flat to shoot pornographic films, all under the noses of the local police.

The mystery series ran for 13 episodes from January 17 to April 11, 1978, and was a big ratings hit for ITV, consistently making the Top 20, and at one point reached 4th in the ratings with a peak viewing audience of 16.6 million. Despite this, there wasn't a second series, but that may have been down to the sudden and mysterious disappearance of its writer Ian Mackintosh the following year, who along with his girlfriend Susan Insole and friend and pilot Graham Barber went on a flight over the Gulf of Alaska on July 7, 1979, and disappeared. No sign of any of the passengers or any wreckage of the plane has ever been found.

Cast

Rupert Wilde - John Stride
Amy Wilde - Julia Foster
Christopher Bridgewater - John Lee

Crew

Producer - Ian Mackintosh
Executive Producer - David Cunliffe
Theme music - Anthony Isaac

Episodes

DVD release

The complete series is available on DVD in the UK.

References

External links
 

1978 British television series debuts
1978 British television series endings
1970s British drama television series
1970s British television miniseries
ITV television dramas
Television series by ITV Studios
Television series by Yorkshire Television
English-language television shows
British detective television series